Mitzi Gould (born July 22, 1915) was an American actress. Before her marriage in 1937 she was known as Mitzi Haynes.

Early years
Gould was born in New York City, and as a child, she learned to speak Hungarian before she learned to speak English. She went on to become fluent in French as well as in English. She graduated from New York University with a bachelor of arts degree and a double major in English and French literature. Unable to take a teaching examination after graduation, she took a part in a production of a musical comedy for the summer.

Career
Early in her career, Gould acted in plays, worked as a model, and performed with bands. She debuted on radio in Dear Columbia. Some of her other roles in radio programs are shown in the table below.

She was also a regular cast member of Criminal Case Book and The American School of the Air. Gould also portrayed Nancy Parker in an episode of The Parker Family that was broadcast on NBC television on May 9, 1941.

On Broadway (billed as Mitzi Haynes), Gould appeared in Behind Red Lights (1937) and Banjo Eyes (1941). She also performed at the Hollywood Restaurant and Latin Quarter night clubs in New York.

Personal life
She married film dance director Dave Gould on April 18, 1937. She filed for divorce from him in 1939. In 1943, she married steel executive William Fabrikant after having been married to Walter Pickit, an attorney.

References 

1915 births
20th-century American actresses
American film actresses
American radio actresses
American soap opera actresses
American stage actresses
Actresses from New York City
Year of death missing